Kübra Akman (born 13 October 1994) is a Turkish volleyball player.

Career
She played for Nilüfer Belediyespor before she transferred in 2012 to VakıfBank Türk Telekom. Akman was a member of the girls' youth national team and the women's junior national team. She wears number 3.

Akman won the gold medal at the 2013 Club World Championship playing with Vakıfbank Istanbul. Three years later she won the bronze medal at the 2016 Club World Championship with the same club.

Awards

National team
 2011 FIVB Girls Youth World Championship - 
 2011 European Youth Summer Olympic Festival - 
 2012 Women's Junior European Volleyball Championship - 
 2014 Women's European Volleyball League - 
 2015 FIVB Volleyball Women's U23 World Championship - 
 2015 European Games - champion
 2017 European Championship -  Bronze Medal
 2019 European Championship -  Silver Medal
 2021 Nations League -   Bronze Medal

Clubs
 2013 Club World Championship - , with Vakıfbank Istanbul
 2016 Club World Championship - , with Vakıfbank Istanbul
 2016–17 CEV Champions League - , with VakıfBank Istanbul
 2017 FIVB Women's Club World Championship - , with VakıfBank Istanbul
 2017–18 Turkish League - , with VakıfBank Istanbul
 2017–18 CEV Champions League - , with VakıfBank Istanbul
2019 FIVB Club World Championship –  Bronze medal, with VakıfBank 
 2020 Turkish Super Cup -  Runner-Up, with VakıfBank S.K.
 2021–22 Turkish League - , with VakıfBank Istanbul
 2021–22 CEV Champions League - , with VakıfBank Istanbul

Individuals
 2014 Women's European Volleyball League Most Valuable Player
 2015 FIVB Volleyball Women's U23 World Championship Best Middle Blocker
 2017 FIVB Women's Club World Championship 2nd Best Middle Blocker

See also
Turkish women in sports

References

1994 births
People from İznik
Living people
Turkish women's volleyball players
VakıfBank S.K. volleyballers
Nilüfer Belediyespor volleyballers
European Games gold medalists for Turkey
European Games medalists in volleyball
Volleyball players at the 2015 European Games
Turkey women's international volleyball players
Volleyball players at the 2020 Summer Olympics
Olympic volleyball players of Turkey